Conchita Martínez was the defending champion, but did not compete this year.

Shahar Pe'er won the title by defeating Jelena Kostanić 6–3, 6–1 in the final.

Seeds

Draw

Finals

Top half

Bottom half

References
 Main and Qualifying Draws (WTA)

Singles
Pattaya Women's Open - Singles
 in women's tennis